Iridana rougeoti, the Rougeot's sapphire gem, is a butterfly in the family Lycaenidae. It is found in Sierra Leone, Ivory Coast, Ghana, western Nigeria, Gabon, the Central African Republic and the Democratic Republic of the Congo. The habitat consists of forests.

References

Butterflies described in 1964
Poritiinae